Rafael Jose Betancourt  (born April 29, 1975) is a Venezuelan former professional baseball relief pitcher. He played in Major League Baseball (MLB) for the Cleveland Indians and Colorado Rockies, as well as in Nippon Professional Baseball (NPB) for the Yokohama BayStars.

Career

Boston Red Sox
He was originally signed as an amateur free agent by the Boston Red Sox in September 1993. The Red Sox released him following the 1999 season and then re-signed him as a free agent in December 2000 after he spent the 2000 season with the Yokohama BayStars. He was granted free agency again in October 2001, after serving the required time to acquire free agency.

Cleveland Indians

After sitting out the 2002 season he signed with the Cleveland Indians as a minor league free agent and made his Major League debut for the Indians on July 13, 2003, against the Chicago White Sox. He pitched in 33 games for the Indians, registering an ERA of 2.13.

In 2004, Betancourt went 5–6, his first full season in the Majors.

On July 8, 2005, he became the sixth Major League player to be suspended for testing positive in steroids testing. He went on to appear in 54 games.

In 2006, Betancourt's ERA grew a full run higher than his previous season. Betancourt's best season was in 2007, as he registered career bests in ERA, Innings pitched and walks allowed.

On January 23, 2008, he signed a new two-year contract with the Indians with a club option for 2010.

Colorado Rockies
On July 22, 2009, Betancourt was traded to the Colorado Rockies for minor league pitcher Connor Graham. His $5.4 million club option was declined at the end of the season, making him a free agent. Betancourt qualified as a Type A free agent, and was offered arbitration by the Rockies.

On December 7, 2009, Betancourt accepted the arbitration offer from the Rockies, returning to the team from free agency.

After numerous seasons being a set up man, Betancourt was given the closer role in 2012, saving 31 games for the Rockies.

On August 22, 2013, Betancourt suffered a season-ending injury to his elbow.

On April 25, 2014, Betancourt signed a new minor league deal with the Rockies.

On January 30, 2015, Betancourt signed a minor league contract to remain with the Rockies.

On August 23, 2015, Betancourt was designated for assignment. He was released 4 days later.

Betancourt announced his retirement from baseball on February 26, 2016.

Pitching style
His best pitches were a 90–94 MPH four-seam fastball, and a slider which was often mistakenly called a slurve. He also threw a changeup. Although he was not classified as a strikeout pitcher, Betancourt got more than his share by throwing a significant number of strikes. He was a converted shortstop with a metal plate and six screws in his pitching elbow.

Betancourt was known in some circles for his odd windup. He constantly tapped his foot on the rubber before coming set with a runner on base. He would constantly move his hands around and then tug on his baseball cap (sometimes doing it nine times) prior to throwing the next pitch.  This was among the longest windups in the league. There is a rule to avoid unnecessary delays which states that if a pitcher takes at least 12 seconds to deliver a pitch, the pitch is automatically ruled a ball. Betancourt was one of the few pitchers who have had this rule enforced while pitching.

See also

List of sportspeople sanctioned for doping offenses
List of Major League Baseball players from Venezuela

References

External links

Weak-hitting shortstop found new life in bullpen

1975 births
Living people
Akron Aeros players
Buffalo Bisons (minor league) players
Cleveland Indians players
Colorado Rockies players
Colorado Springs Sky Sox players
Columbus Clippers players
Grand Junction Rockies players
Gulf Coast Red Sox players
Major League Baseball pitchers
Major League Baseball players from Venezuela
Major League Baseball players suspended for drug offenses
Michigan Battle Cats players
Nippon Professional Baseball pitchers
People from Cumaná
Sarasota Red Sox players
Trenton Thunder players
Venezuelan expatriate baseball players in Japan
Venezuelan expatriate baseball players in the United States
Venezuelan sportspeople in doping cases
World Baseball Classic players of Venezuela
Yokohama BayStars players
2006 World Baseball Classic players